Apfel Glacier is a glacier about  wide and  long, flowing west-northwest along the south flank of the Bunger Hills and terminating in Edisto Ice Tongue. It was mapped from air photos taken by U.S. Navy Operation Highjump, 1946–47, and named by the Advisory Committee on Antarctic Names for Earl T. Apfel, professor of geology at Syracuse University, who served as geologist with the U.S. Navy Operation Windmill parties, 1947–48, which established astronomical control stations along Queen Mary, Knox and Budd Coasts.

See also
 List of glaciers in the Antarctic
 Glaciology

References 

Glaciers of Queen Mary Land